Twilight on the Prairie is a 1944 American Western film directed by Jean Yarbrough and written by Clyde Bruckman. The film stars Johnny Downs, Vivian Austin, Leon Errol, Connie Haines, Eddie Quillan, Milburn Stone and Jimmie Dodd. The film was released on July 14, 1944, by Universal Pictures.

Plot

Cast         
Johnny Downs as Bucky
Vivian Austin as Sally Barton
Leon Errol as Cactus 
Connie Haines as Ginger
Eddie Quillan as Phil
Milburn Stone as Gainsworth
Jimmie Dodd as Chuck
Olin Howland as Jed 
Perc Launders as Hank
Foy Willing as Foy Willing
Jack Teagarden as Jack Teagarden
Dennis Moore as Jason
Ralph Peters as Texas Bill

References

External links
 

1944 films
American Western (genre) films
1944 Western (genre) films
Universal Pictures films
Films directed by Jean Yarbrough
American black-and-white films
1940s English-language films
1940s American films